Countdown to Doomsday is a 1966 German-Italian-French Eurospy film written and directed by Marcello Baldi and starring George Ardisson. It was the last spy film of Ardisson. The film was a box office disappointment.

Plot
A Private Detective is hired by a rich oil baron to find his kidnapped Daughter. After many encounters with local gangsters, Jeff Merlin finds the girl strapped to a bomb.

Cast

References

External links

1966 films
1960s spy thriller films
West German films
German spy thriller films
Italian spy thriller films
French spy thriller films
Films directed by Marcello Baldi
Films set in Venezuela
Films about the illegal drug trade
French detective films
German detective films
Italian detective films
1960s Italian films
1960s German films
1960s French films
1960s Italian-language films
Italian-language French films
Italian-language German films